Dorian Tomasiak (born 6 June 1993), known professionally as Tom Swoon (and previously as Pixel Cheese), is a Polish former DJ and record producer.

Tom Swoon used to host Lift Off Radio on Electro City on Dash Radio. He debuted in the DJ Mags 2015 Top 100 DJs voting poll as No. 46.

On 5 December 2017, Tomasiak drove drunk and was charged in a car accident that led to the death of one person and injured another. On 6 June 2018, Tomasiak announced the end of the "Tom Swoon" project in a public statement letter sent from prison. He was later sentenced to four years and eight months of prison.

Biography

Tomasiak was born on 6 June 1993 in Goleniów, Poland. His interest in music started at a very young age. At the age of 17, he discovered electronic dance music and was inspired by artists such as deadmau5 and Daft Punk. Over the next few years, he taught himself the art of DJing and saved up his earnings and bought a proper DJ setup, transforming himself from a bedroom DJ into an artist with an unrivaled drive for music production.

In late 2011, his first official remix of Gareth Emery's single "Tokyo" was released on Garuda and climbed into Beatport's Top 100 chart. This remix was followed by two other remixes for Steve Aoki and Kaskade, "Ladi Dadi" and "Room for Happiness", respectively. In March 2012, his debut track, "Elva", was released on Ultra Records. Two months later, he remixed Nervo's "You're Gonna Love Again" on EMI, his last release under the alias Pixel Cheese.

Securing over twenty tour dates in his debut year to complement his original releases and remixes, Tom Swoon ended the year warming up for Avicii on his concert tour and on a tour of India with Steve Aoki. Nominated by Nervo as their 'Breakthrough Artist DJ for 2012', and voted as the "Polish Breakthrough DJ of the Year" by FTB Poland, both Mixmag and Billboard Magazine called Swoon an 'Artist to Watch' in 2013.

With his remix of Bloody Beetroots - "Chronicles of a Fallen Love", he received further acclaim. His collaboration with Amba Shepherd, "Not Too Late", was followed by a remix package by Bassnectar and Patrick Reza, Maor Levi, Sebjak and Josef Belani. "Not Too Late" also premiered Tom Swoon's first official music video, which was shot and produced in Tokyo. Swoon was called in for another set of remixes for Nervo, Sultan & Ned Shepard's single "Army" and Benny Benassi's collaboration with John Legend called "Dance The Pain Away". In between such duties, Tom's fourth single, "Wings", was released in July and received support from a variety of dance musicians, with the remix by Myon & Shane 54 topping the Beatport trance chart at the No. 1 position for several weeks.

In the third quarter of 2013, Tom Swoon released another collaboration titled "Rollercoaster", together with Josef Belani. On 29 October 2013, he released his remix of Burn It Down by American rock band Linkin Park, which was included in their album Recharged. In December 2013, Tom Swoon launched his own weekly radio show and podcast titled "LIFT OFF Radio", which was broadcast through iTunes and Soundcloud.

In late 2013, he released "Synchronize", a collaboration with Paris Blohm and Hadouken!, which reached the No. 12 position on Beatport progressive charts and hovered for over a month on the top No. 20. 2014 saw the release of his collaboration "Wait" with Paris & Simo, which was released on Spinnin Records. Later that year, DJ Mag also revealed that he had placed 130th in voting for their annual Top 100 DJs poll.

Fatal crash and suspension of career 
In the early morning of 5 December 2017 in his neighbourhood in Poland, he was driving his car under influence of alcohol and caused an accident killing one person and seriously harming another. The prosecutor's office accused him of causing an accident with fatal consequences while driving under the influence of alcohol.

Tom Swoon announced in a public statement on 6 June 2018, that he will be ending his career in music. On 4 September 2018, he was sentenced to four years and eight months in prison, after pleading guilty in court for manslaughter. Swoon also had to pay 280,000 zlotys to the wife and children of the victim, and had his driving license permanently removed. He cited not being able to recall the events prior to the accident, and apologised to the victim's wife for his deeds.

Discography

Songs 
 2017: Beside Me (with Tungevaag & Raaban)
 2017: Don't Let Me Go (with Wasback and Poli JR)
 2017: All I Ever Wanted (with Blasterjaxx)
 2017: Shingaling
 2017: Helter Skelter (with Maximals)
 2017: Atom (with Teamworx)
 2016: All The Way Down (with Kill The Buzz)
 2016: Never Giving Up
 2016: Phoenix (We Rise) (with Belle Humble and Dank)
 2016: I'm Leaving (with Quentin Mosimann featuring Ilang)
 2015: Stay Together (with Nari & Milani)
 2015: Alive (with Ale Q and Sonny Noto)
 2015: Last Goodbye (with Swanky Tunes)
 2015: Here I Stand (with Kerano featuring Cimo Fränkel)
 2015: Zulu
 2015: I Am You (with First State featuring Beth)
 2014: Savior (featuring Ruby Prophet)
 2014: Ghost (with Stadiumx featuring Rico & Miella)
 2014: Wait (with Paris & Simo featuring Eyelar)
 2014: Holika
 2014: Otherside (featuring Niclas Lundin)
 2014: Ahead of Us (with Lush & Simon)
 2013: Synchronize (with Paris Blohm featuring Hadouken!)
 2013: Rollercoaster (with Josef Belani)
 2013: Wings (featuring Taylr Renee)
 2013: Not Too Late (featuring Amba Shepherd)
 2012: Who We Are (featuring Miss Palmer)
 2012: Elva (as Pixel Cheese)

Remixes
As Tom Swoon
 2017: Tabitha Nauser – Bulletproof (Tom Swoon Remix)
 2017: Lorde – Green Light (Tom Swoon Remix)
 2016: Robert Falcon and Shaan – Mirage (Tom Swoon Remode)
 2016: Matthew Koma – Kisses Back (Tom Swoon and Indigo Remix)
 2016: Funkerman – Speed Up (Tom Swoon Remix)
 2016: Justin Oh – Start Again (Tom Swoon Edit)
 2016: Kenn Colt featuring Ilang - Sanctify (Tom Swoon and Hiisak Remix)
 2016: Hiisak - La Fanfarra (Tom Swoon Edit)
 2016: Djerem – I'm In Love (Tom Swoon Remix)
 2016: Ale Q and Avedon featuring Jonathan Mendelsohn – Open My Eyes (Tom Swoon Edit)
 2016: Steve Aoki featuring Matthew Koma – Hysteria (Tom Swoon and Vigel Remix)
 2016: Sarsa – Zapomnij mi (Tom Swoon Remix)
 2015: Tom Swoon, Paris & Simo – Wait (Tom Swoon and ak9 Remix)
 2015: Leona Lewis - Thunder (Tom Swoon Remix)
 2015: Vigel featuring Laces – Nothing To Lose (Tom Swoon Edit)
 2015: Dúné vs. Tom Swoon – Last Soldiers (Tom Swoon 'Nightride' Mix)
 2015: Owl City featuring Aloe Blacc – The Verge (Tom Swoon Remix)
 2015: Kelly Clarkson – Invincible (Tom Swoon Remix)
 2015: Five Knives – Savages (Tom Swoon Remix)
 2015: Kid Arkade featuring Josh Franceschi – Not Alone (Tom Swoon Remix)
 2014: Krewella – Human (Tom Swoon Remix)
 2014: Stafford Brothers and Eva Simons – This Girl (Tom Swoon Remix)
 2014: Jus Jack – Stars (Tom Swoon Remix)
 2013: Ellie Goulding – Hanging On (Tom Swoon Remix)
 2013: Linkin Park – Burn It Down (Tom Swoon Remix)
 2013: Paul Oakenfold – Touched by You (Tom Swoon Remix)
 2013: Benny Benassi featuring John Legend – Dance the Pain Away (Tom Swoon Remix)
 2013: Jimmy Carris featuring Polina – Open Your Heart (Tom Swoon Remix)
 2013: Sultan & Shepard and Nervo featuring Omarion – Army (Tom Swoon Remix)
 2013: Flo Rida – Let It Roll (Tom Swoon Remix)
 2013: Gareth Emery and Ashley Wallbridge – DUI (Tom Swoon Remix)
 2013: Dido – No Freedom (Tom Swoon Remix)
 2013: Steve Aoki and Angger Dimas vs Dimitri Vegas & Like Mike – Phat Brahms (Tom Swoon Remix)
 2013: Tara McDonald – Give Me More (Tom Swoon Remix)
 2013: Bloody Beetroots featuring Greta Svabo Bech – Chronicles of a Fallen Love (Tom Swoon Remix)
 2012: Flo Rida and Jennifer Lopez – Sweet Spot (Tom Swoon Remix)
 2012: Drumsound & Bassline Smith featuring Hadouken! – Daylight (Tom Swoon Remix)
 2012: Topher Jones – Hello Chicago (Tom Swoon Remix)
 2012: Alex Gaudino featuring Taboo – I Don't Wanna Dance (Tom Swoon Remix)

As Pixel Cheese
 2012: Nervo – You're Gonna Love Again (Pixel Cheese Remix)
 2012: Qpid – Waterfall (Pixel Cheese Remix)
 2012: Kaskade feat Skylar Grey – Room for Happiness (Pixel Cheese Remix)
 2012: Steve Aoki feat Wynter Gordon – Ladi Dadi (Pixel Cheese Remix)
 2011: Gareth Emery – Tokyo (Pixel Cheese Remix)
 2011: David Guetta, Avicii and Laidback Luke - Till Sunshine (Pixel Cheese Bootleg)

References

1993 births
Living people
Remixers
Polish record producers
Polish DJs
People from Goleniów
Progressive house musicians
Revealed Recordings artists
Electronic dance music DJs